Josse de Corte (1627–1679) was a Baroque Flemish sculptor, born in Ypres, but mainly active in Venice after 1657.

History
He is also known as Giusto Le Court Giusto Cort or Josse Lecurt or Josse Cort. He obtained some training in Rome by François Duquesnoy.

His masterpiece is the theatrical and dynamic high altar sculptural complex depicting the Queen of Heaven expelling the Plague for the church of Santa Maria della Salute in Venice. It depicts the Virgin Mary saving pleading figures and scattering the personified evil of the plague.

He also completed part of the Morosini Monument in San Clemente all'Isola in Venice. He also sculpted the Atlantes on the façade of the church of the Ospedaletto in Venice. Among his pupils in Venice were Heinrich Meyring (Enrico Merengo), Francesco Cavrioli, Francesco Penso, and Orazio Marinali. Together they all contributed, together with Tommaso Rues influenced by Le Court to the extensive sculptural decoration of the exterior of the church of the Salute.

References

1627 births
1679 deaths
Flemish Baroque sculptors
Italian sculptors
Italian male sculptors
Artists from Ypres
17th-century Flemish sculptors
17th-century Venetian people